Yuriy Mikhailovich Borzakovskiy (born 12 April 1981) is a Russian middle-distance runner specializing in the 800 metres.

Early life
Borzakovskiy was born at Kratovo, in the Moscow Oblast.  He was named for the Russian cosmonaut Yuri Gagarin.

Athletic career

Borzakovskiy's first major international success was a victory at the 2000 European Indoor Championships when he was only 18 years old. At the 2000 Summer Olympics he reached the 800 m final, in which he finished sixth. In 2001 he won the World Indoor title over 800 m but decided not to participate in the World Championships in Edmonton. On 24 August 2001, Borzakovskiy posted a time of 1:42.47 minutes. That currently makes him the 12th fastest man in history over that distance. In addition, Borzakovskiy was ranked No.1 in the world in that year. In 2002, Borzakovskiy ran the 400 m at the European Championships in Munich but was eliminated in the early stages. The following season he picked up a silver medal over 800 m at the World Championships in Paris.

Borzakovskiy's greatest achievement was his victory in the 800 m race at the Athens Olympics in 2004. By this point, he was well known for sitting back until about the last 200 metres and then using a great kick to catch up and win, reminiscent of the tactics of United States's Dave Wottle. At the Olympics he employed the same strategy, using this 'late charge' to come from behind in the last 150 meters to pass world record holder Wilson Kipketer, who was leading with only 20 metres to go, and take the victory.  Borzakovskiy's decisive pass so deflated Kipketer that he allowed Mbulaeni Mulaudzi to nip him at the line.

In the 2005 World Championships he took silver in the 800 m competition, overtaking everyone but Bahrain's Rashid Ramzi on the final straight. Ramzi was disqualified from the 2008 Olympics for doping violations but so far has been allowed to keep his prior medals.  At the 2006 World Indoor Championships he won a bronze medal. Borzakovskiy won a bronze medal at the 2007 World Championships in Osaka. The final ran at a very slow pace and he was boxed in on the final lap which slowed down his sprint in the last 100 m.

In 2008 he made an impressive comeback by posting a time of 1:42.79 minutes, his first time under 1:43 since 2001. He made the Olympic team at the Beijing Olympics but unexpectedly failed to qualify for the 800 m final, finishing only third in his semifinal heat.

In 2009 he won gold at the European Indoor Championships in 1:48.55. On 23 August he placed fourth at the final of the 12th IAAF World Championships in Berlin in 1:45.57. Most of his 2010 season was lost due to an injury.

In 2011, he achieved yet another podium finish with a bronze medal in the 800 meters at the 2011 IAAF World Outdoor Championships.  In this race, Borzakovskiy ran most of the last lap in second place and was himself overtaken just before the finish line.

In 2012, he won the European Championships 800 metre gold medal, in Helsinki.  At the 2012 London Olympics, he failed to make the finals as he was eliminated in the semi-final round.

See also
800 metres at the Olympics
800 metres at the World Championships in Athletics
List of 2004 Summer Olympics medal winners
List of European Athletics Championships medalists (men)
List of male middle-distance runners
List of Olympic medalists in athletics (men)
List of Russian sportspeople
List of World Athletics Championships medalists (men)

References

1981 births
Living people
People from Ramensky District
Sportspeople from Moscow Oblast
Russian male middle-distance runners
Olympic male middle-distance runners
Olympic athletes of Russia
Olympic gold medalists for Russia
Olympic gold medalists in athletics (track and field)
Athletes (track and field) at the 2000 Summer Olympics
Athletes (track and field) at the 2004 Summer Olympics
Athletes (track and field) at the 2008 Summer Olympics
Athletes (track and field) at the 2012 Summer Olympics
Medalists at the 2004 Summer Olympics
World Athletics Championships medalists
World Athletics Indoor Championships winners
European Athletics Championships winners
European Athletics Championships medalists
European Athletics Indoor Championships winners
Russian Athletics Championships winners
Mordvin people